General Geoffrey Kemp Bourne, Baron Bourne,  (5 October 1902 – 26 June 1982) was a British Army officer.

Military career
Commissioned into the Royal Artillery in 1923, Bourne served in Hong Kong from 1930 to 1932, in Gibraltar from 1933 and 1934, in the Staff College, Camberley in 1935 and 1936, and in Colchester in 1937. In 1938 and 1939, he was General Staff Officer at the War Office.

During the Second World War, Bourne was a member of the Joint Planning Staff between 1939 and 1941, and a member of the Joint Staff Mission in Washington, D.C. in 1942. In 1944, he was Commander of the 152nd (Ayrshire Yeomanry) Field Regiment, Royal Artillery, fighting in Italy, and member of the General Staff Airborne Corps fighting in Belgium.

Between 1945 and 1946, Bourne commanded the 5th Indian Division, in Java and worked at the Imperial Defence College in 1947. He was Head of the British Mission to Burma in 1948 and Commandant of the British Sector in Berlin from 1949 to 1951. Between 1951 and 1953 he commanded 16th Airborne Division, was General Officer Commanding-in-Chief Eastern Command between 1953 and 1954, and General Officer Commanding Malaya between 1954 and 1956. Bourne was Commander-in-Chief, Middle East Land Forces in 1957 and Commandant of the Imperial Defence College between 1958 and 1959. He retired in 1960.

Bourne was also Aide-de-Camp General to The Queen in 1959 and 1960, Colonel Commandant of the Royal Artillery from 1954 to 1967 and Honorary Colonel, 10 Battalion The Parachute Regiment, Territorial Army from 1960 to 1965.

Personal life
On 11 July 1928, Bourne married Agnes Evelyn Thompson, daughter of Sir Ernest Thompson. The couple had one son, the Hon. Michael Bourne (1937–2013) and one daughter. Lady Bourne died in 1990.

Bourne was invested as a Companion of the Order of St Michael and St George, as a Knight Commander of the Order of the British Empire, and as a Knight Grand Cross of the Order of the Bath. On 22 August 1964, he was created a life peer with the title Baron Bourne, of Atherstone in the County of Warwick.

Arms

References

External links
Generals of World War II

|-

|-

|-

|-

|-

1902 births
1982 deaths
Military personnel from London
People from Kensington
British Army generals
British Army brigadiers of World War II
Companions of the Order of St Michael and St George
Knights Commander of the Order of the British Empire
Knights Grand Cross of the Order of the Bath
Life peers
Royal Artillery officers
British Army personnel of the Malayan Emergency
Graduates of the Staff College, Camberley
Ayrshire (Earl of Carrick's Own) Yeomanry officers
Life peers created by Elizabeth II